Archontophoenix maxima, the Walsh River palm, is the largest species of the genus Archontophoenix.
It is endemic to Queensland, Australia.

Description 
The flowers closely resemble those of A. alexandrae.

References

External links
 
 
 View a map of historical sightings of this species at the Australasian Virtual Herbarium
 View observations of this species on iNaturalist
 View images of this species on Flickriver

maxima
Palms of Australia
Endemic flora of Queensland
Taxa named by John Leslie Dowe
Taxa described in 1994